The Dunfermline Building Society was a building society and later a trading division of Nationwide Building Society,  based in Dunfermline, Scotland. Before its 2009 merger with Nationwide, it was the largest building society in Scotland and the 12th largest in the United Kingdom based on total assets of £3.3 billion at 31 December 2007.  It was a member of the Building Societies Association.

On 28 March 2009, reports indicated the Society was no longer viable, and would be put up for public sale, to be managed by the Bank of England. This process led to acquisition of the Society's branches, good loans and deposits by the Nationwide Building Society with the Bank of England assuming control of £1bn in commercial lending and the Society's poorer-quality and shared ownership mortgages. The Dunfermline was fully integrated into Nationwide in June 2014.

History

The Dunfermline was established in 1869 in the town of Dunfermline from which it took its name.

It expanded throughout the 19th and 20th centuries, and acquired over 20 other organisations including: the Stenhousemuir, Peebles, Fourth Fifeshire Investment Company, the Stirlingshire, and the Edinburgh and Paisley Building Society.

A telephone banking service, Dunfermline Direct, was launched during Spring 1999.

By the end of 2005, the Society had 34 branches and 38 agencies throughout Scotland. Around 20% of its business was generated outwith Scotland.

2009 financial crisis
In the 6 months running up to March 2009 the Board explored various options to secure an injection of capital (between £60m and £100m) which would allow the Building Society to continue operating as an independent mutual building society. The Financial Services Authority (FSA) stated that such capital would not be possible.

On 28 March 2009, reports indicated the building society was no longer viable, toxic assets would be stripped out and the remaining business put up for public sale, to be managed by the Tripartite Authorities (Bank of England, FSA and HM Treasury). BBC Scotland business editor Douglas Fraser broke the story, where a £26m loss was announced in late March 2009. Around 500 jobs are at risk, where half are employed at its headquarters in Fife and half in the network of 34 branches.

It was announced on 30 March that the Nationwide Building Society had bought the retail and wholesale deposits, branches, head office and most of the residential mortgage book of the Dunfermline, with the Bank of England assuming control of £1bn in commercial lending. Dunfermline became a trading division of Nationwide.

On 24 October 2013, Nationwide announced that Dunfermline Building Society would be merged with the company.

References

External links

 Dunfermline Building Society
 Building Societies Association
 KPMG Building Societies Database 2008

Financial services companies established in 1869
1869 establishments in Scotland
19th century in Scotland
Companies based in Fife
Dunfermline
Scottish brands
Organizations established in 1869
Financial services companies of Scotland